Makiivka is a village in Svatove Raion (district) in Luhansk Oblast of eastern Ukraine, at about  northwest of the centre of Luhansk city. It belongs to Krasnorichenske settlement hromada, one of the hromadas of Ukraine.

The village came under attack by Russian forces during the 2022 Russian invasion of Ukraine, with Ukrainian forces entering it in the beginning of October the same year. The regional military administration reported on 13 November that the settlement was under Ukrainian control.

Name confusion with city in another oblast
A city in Donetsk Oblast has the same name, and that city made international news in January 2023, during the Russo-Ukrainian War.

According to a count by Russian authorities, a Ukrainian HIMARS missile attack killed 400 Russian troops who had been using an abandoned school in the eponymous Donetsk Oblast city of Makiivka as a base of operations on the night of 31 December 2022/1 January 2023.

See also
 Makiivka surrender incident

References

Villages in Svatove Raion